Ned Polsky ( – ) was an American author and sociologist who wrote the 1969 book Hustlers, Beats, and Others, about political culture, criminology and pool hustlers. He was also known for his criticism of Norman Mailer's essay The White Negro, included with the essay in later collections of Mailer's work, and as an "insane Joyce fanatic" who memorized long passages from Finnegans Wake.

Polsky studied linguistics and literature at the University of Wisconsin, and did graduate study in sociology (but did not complete a degree) at the University of Chicago. He was for many years a professor of sociology at Stony Brook University, and served as vice president of the Society for the Study of Social Problems in 1971–1972. He was also a skilled pool player, and in his retirement became an antiquarian bookseller.

In 1968, he signed the "Writers and Editors War Tax Protest" pledge, vowing to refuse tax payments in protest against the Vietnam War.

References

American tax resisters
1928 births
2000 deaths
20th-century American male writers
American sociologists
University of Wisconsin–Madison College of Letters and Science alumni
University of Chicago alumni
Stony Brook University faculty